Keratosis palmoplantaris transgrediens et progrediens may refer to:
 Erythrokeratodermia variabilis
 Palmoplantar keratoderma of Sybert

Palmoplantar keratodermas